St. George's School ( Madrasat al-Mutran) is a British boys' school in East Jerusalem run by the Anglican diocese of Jerusalem.

St. George's School is located next to St. George's College, just outside the walls of the Old City of Jerusalem.  The school was established in 1899. The Rev. Wilbert Awdry, author of The Railway Series, taught at the school in 1933–1936. Built in the affluent Sheikh Jarrah neighborhood, it served as a place where Jerusalem's Christians and Muslims would send their sons for secondary education.

The school currently runs the regular Tawjihi program.

Notable alumni
 Dimitri Baramki
 Ziad Rafiq Beydoun
 Emil Ghuri
 Ismail Khalidi
 Manoug Manougian
 Mufid Nashashibi
 Sari Nusseibeh
 Stav Prodromou
 Edward Said
 Ibrahim Touqan
 Nasser Sabah Al-Ahmad Al-Sabah

See also
 St. George's College, Jerusalem

References

External links

 Saint George's School Website

Bibliography

1899 establishments in the Ottoman Empire
Anglicanism in Palestine (region)
Anglican schools in Asia
Christianity in Jerusalem
Educational institutions established in 1899
People educated at St George's School, Jerusalem
Schools in Jerusalem
Sheikh Jarrah